Modern Lore is the fifth studio album by American jazz guitarist Julian Lage which was released in February 2018 by Mack Avenue Records.

Reception

Response was positive, with Metacritic assigning the album an aggregate score of 81 out of 100 based on 4 critical reviews indicating "Universal acclaim".

The Allmusic review by Thom Jurek stated "It's simply instrumental, Americana-tinged rock with a smattering of jazz improvisation and other exotic touches woven in ... This is Lage and his trio playing for themselves and obviously enjoying it; they create an easy intimacy and offer a warm welcome for listeners. The music here is not only solid, but attractive and clever to boot".

On All About Jazz, Gareth Thompson's review enthused "Modern Lore seeks out the very foundations of rock music and digs deep ... Tagging this collection as some kind of 'jazz-rock' outing would be simplistic and gruff. For sure it moves Lage into new arenas, but when did he ever remain static? Modern Lore is a perfect paean to the electric guitar and all its sensual traditions". On the same site Doug Collette said "Modern Lore constitutes a measure of guitarist Julian Lage's grasp of the pragmatic values of a working musician ... The uniformity within this record is comparable to the last in terms of both conception and execution. Yet Modern Lore isn't merely more of the same as the last record ... Although he's never merely workmanlike in his playing or writing (he composed all the material on the album), Julian Lage is too understated a musician/composer to literally grab attention. Rather, he entices a listener with the warm incisive fingerwork ... this music, as with the entire body of work by the guitarist to whom it's credited, holds the potential for consistently rewarding listening over an unusually extended period of time".

Paste reviewer Robert Ham observed "the result is a snappy, multi-colored affair that gives him ample room to show off his unmatched skills with his chosen instrument. For much of the album, Lage looks for ways to expand upon the mode of the country picker ... Elsewhere on the album, he and his band write songs that feel like adult contemporary pop hits just waiting for a vocalist to help take them to the charts ... Modern Lore even drops a little experimental number in the mix. But just a little ...but it’s also what helps turn Modern Lore from a good album into something closer to great. The comfort that Lage and his bandmates evince needs those small shakeups to keep from devolving into something pleasant but unengaging. The trio toes that line at times on this new release without completely falling into pure background fodder. It’s a delicate balance that only the best players could attain. Time will tell if they can maintain it 

NPR's Nate Chinen noted "this one feels loose and unburdened. It's the strongest album of Lage's career so far, and the first that fully captures his trademark melding of fleet precision, open-road possibility and radiant self-assurance. If that sounds like a distinctly American set of qualities, so be it: Lage is a distinctly American sort of artist. His musical persona draws from the expansive jazz continuum (ragtime to bebop and beyond) as well as rustic folk music and the blues. And because this trio features him on a Fender Telecaster, the countrified side of his playing often shines through".

In JazzTimes Natalie Weiner wrote "Lage’s 11 original compositions abstract some of the most iconic sounds in American music, with hints of rock, country and folk all coming through in his warm, intimate tone ... That is not to say the cozy result lacks urgency. Lage’s virtuosity manifests in precise, clear improvisation that doesn’t require technical fireworks, spotlighting instead his remarkable gift for melody. In the few moments when his experimental side comes through, though, it’s clear how important dissonance and dynamics are to tempering the album’s generally gentle, whimsical sound".

Track listing
All compositions by Julian Lage

Personnel 
 Julian Lage – guitar
 Scott Colley – bass
 Kenny Wollesen – drums, vibraphone
 Tyler Chester – keyboards
 Jesse Harris – maracas, casio synthesizer, acoustic guitar (tracks: 2, 3, 5- 7 & 11)

References

Julian Lage albums
2018 albums
Mack Avenue Records albums